The 2010 American Express – TED Open was a professional tennis tournament played on outdoor hard courts. It was the twenty-fourth edition of the tournament which is part of the 2010 ATP Challenger Tour. It took place in Istanbul, Turkey between 9 and 15 August 2010.

ATP entrants

Seeds

 Rankings are as of August 2, 2010.

Other entrants
The following players received wildcards into the singles main draw:
  Haluk Akkoyun
  Tuna Altuna
  George Bastl
  Marsel İlhan

The following players received a Special Exempt into the singles main draw:
  Laurent Recouderc
  Vincent Millot

The following players received entry from the qualifying draw:
  Arsen Asanov
  Javier Martí
  Filip Prpic
  João Sousa

Champions

Singles

 Adrian Mannarino def.  Mikhail Kukushkin, 6–4, 3–6, 6–3

Doubles

 Leoš Friedl /  Dušan Vemić def.  Brian Battistone /  Andreas Siljeström, 7–6(6), 7–6(3)

External links
Official website
ITF search 
2010 Draws

American Express - TED Open
PTT İstanbul Cup
PTT